Surfer Jeff is an album by the Wiggles, released in 2012, by ABC Music, distributed by Universal Music Australia. The album won the ARIA Award for Best Children's Album at the ARIA Music Awards of 2012.

Track list

Video

Surfer Jeff was released on ABC DVD in 2012. Greg Page returns as the yellow Wiggle.

DVD Song List
 "Here Come Our Friends" 
 "Dorothy the Dinosaur's Beach Party" 
 "Up, Down, Turn Around"
 "The Mini Foxie Puppy Dance"
 "Ooey, Ooey, Ooey Allergies!"
 "It's Peanut Butter!"
 "I Love Oranges"
 "Mango Walk"
 "Banananana"
 "What's The Weather Today?"
 "Rolling Down the Sandhills"
 "Running Up the Sandhills"
 "Olive Oil Is My Secret Ingredient"
 "Balla Balla Bambina"
 "C'est Wags, C'est Bon"
 "Surfer Jeff"
 "An Irish Dinosaur Tale"
 "Would You Like To Go To Scotland?"
 "London Barcarolle"
 "Look Before You Go"
 "Waltzing Matilda"

Cast
The cast as presented on the videos:
 The Wiggles are
 Murray Cook
 Jeff Fatt
 Anthony Field
 Greg Page

Additional Cast
 Captain Feathersword: Paul Paddick
 Dorothy the Dinosaur: Clare Field, Kelly Hamilton, Lauren Hannaford, Caterina Mete, Emma Watkins, and Bláthnald Conroy Murphy (voice)
 Henry the Octopus: Lauren Hannaford, Caterina Mete, and Jeff Fatt (voice)
 Wags the Dog: Lachlan Gillespie, Nick Hutchinson, Adrian Quinnell and Jeff Fatt (voice)
 Gino the Genie: Simon Pryce
 Alfonso the Chef: Alfonso Rinaldi
 Jonesy the Rooster: Michael Jones
 Dr. Jonny Taitz
Scottish Dave

External links

The Wiggles albums
The Wiggles videos
2012 albums
ARIA Award-winning albums
2012 video albums
Australian children's musical films